Agalychnis buckleyi is a species of frog in the subfamily Phyllomedusinae. It is found in Colombia and Ecuador. Its natural habitats are subtropical or tropical moist lowland forests, subtropical or tropical moist montane forests, and freshwater marshes. It is threatened by habitat loss.

References

buckleyi
Amphibians of Colombia
Amphibians of Ecuador
Amphibians described in 1882
Taxonomy articles created by Polbot